Dulab (also Romanized as Dūlāb, Doolāb, and Dowlāb) is a village in Khararud Rural District, in the Central District of Khodabandeh County, Zanjan Province, Iran. At the 2006 census, its population was 117, in 19 families.

References 

Populated places in Khodabandeh County